Donal Leahy (31 August 1938 – 31 December 2015) was an Irish footballer.

Leahy started his career as a wing-half playing with his home town club Evergreen and on 15 September 1956 scored on his debut in a 3–1 League of Ireland Shield defeat to Shamrock Rovers at Glenmalure Park.

He came to Evergreen's notice after starring for Munster Youths against West Germany Youths at The Mardyke in May 1956. Leahy turned down Aston Villa and Blackburn in 1957 to remain in Cork.

Manager Tommy Moroney switched him to a striking role which proved to be an inspired move as he was top scorer in the League of Ireland three seasons running from the 1956-57 League of Ireland season to the 1958-59 League of Ireland season.

Leahy scored on his Inter-League debut against the Irish League XI in March 1957. His prolific scoring rate in his debut season impressed the international selectors enough to place him on standby for the 1958 FIFA World Cup qualification tie against England national football team on 19 May 1957. Little did he know that the politics of the game dictated that he would never win that international honour.

On 3 May 1959 Leahy scored the only goal of the game as Evergreen beat Shamrock Rovers in the Top Four Cup Final at Dalymount Park to earn his first senior medal.

On 5 October 1960  he scored the League of Ireland XI's only goal in a heavy defeat to the Scottish League, an overhead kick, in front of 23,000 fans at Celtic Park.

On 21 January 1962 he scored five goals in Cork Celtic's 8–2 win over St. Patrick's Athletic at Richmond Park (football ground).

In the 1964 FAI Cup Final Leahy scored the equaliser against Shamrock Rovers at Dalymount Park but Celtic lost the replay. After this season disc trouble made it difficult to maintain the sharpness needed for a striking role. He enjoyed the 1964-65 League of Ireland season in midfield but it didn't stop him becoming the first Cork player to score in European competition at PFC Slavia Sofia in the 1964–65 European Cup Winners' Cup.

In February 1967 Leahy requested a transfer saying he was anxious for a change of club 

He also played fullback in the 1967-68 League of Ireland season, the only one of his 14 seasons in which he failed to score in the League of Ireland. The following season, he took charge of Celtic's reserve team, gradually phasing himself out of first team football but he was first choice again by the time the Cup came around and helped the club reach the 1969 FAI Cup Final.

However, he stayed on until December 1969 when he resigned to play non league with Tramore Athletic. Then Limerick persuaded him back into the LOI  where he scored on his debut at the Markets Field 

He retired with back problems at the end of the 1969-70 League of Ireland season.

During his time at his home town club he played in every position.

Leahy came out of retirement to score the winner in Billy Lord's testimonial in May 1976 at Milltown.

In March 1995 Donal Leahy was inducted into the National League Legends roll of honour at a function in Dublin.

When Pat Morley broke his cork record of 162 League of Ireland goals in November 1999 Leahy was there to congratulate him.

At the end of the 2013 League of Ireland season Leahy is joint fifth in the all-time League of Ireland goalscoring list with 162 league goals

Statistics

Inter League goals

List of League goals
1956/57 – 15 for Evergreen (Joint top league goalscorer)
|-
1957/58 – 16 for Evergreen (Top league goalscorer)
|-
1958/59 – 22 for Evergreen (Top league goalscorer)
|-
1959/60 – 20 for Cork Celtic
|-
1960/61 – 21 for Cork Celtic
|-
1961/62 – 18 for Cork Celtic
|-
1962/63 – 7 for Cork Celtic
|-
1963/64 – 16 for Cork Celtic
|-
1964/65 – 5 for Cork Celtic
|-
1965/66 – 8 for Cork Celtic
|-
1966/67 – 5 for Cork Celtic
|-
1967/68 – 0 for Cork Celtic
|-
1968/69 – 5 for Cork Celtic
|-
1969/70 – 4 for Limerick

Honours
League of Ireland Shield
 Cork Celtic –  1960–61
Dublin City Cup
 Cork Celtic –  1961–62
Top Four Cup: 3
 Cork Celtic –  1956–57, 1958–59, 1959–60
Munster Senior Cups: 3
 Cork Celtic –  1960, 1962, 1964

References

Sources
The Book of Irish Goalscorers by Seán Ryan & Stephen Burke 1987

2015 deaths
1938 births
Association footballers from Cork (city)
League of Ireland players
Cork Celtic F.C. players
Limerick F.C. players
League of Ireland XI players
Association football forwards
Republic of Ireland association footballers